Langdon's Company of Light Horse Volunteers was formed on July 21, 1777 at Portsmouth, New Hampshire for Gen. John Stark's Brigade gathering at Charlestown, New Hampshire during the Saratoga Campaign. The company was formed by picked volunteers from other New Hampshire militia units. The company was with Stickney's and Hobart's regiments during the Battle of Bennington. Langdon's Company of Light Horse Volunteers would continue on in Stark's Brigade to cut off British Gen. John Burgoyne from retreat or supply after the Battle of Freeman's Farm. The company would also take part in Gen. John Sullivan's campaign in Rhode Island in 1778. The company was disbanded in the fall of 1778.

Notable members
Wentworth Cheswell

References

External links
Bibliography of the Continental Army in New Hampshire compiled by the United States Army Center of Military History

Military units and formations established in 1777
New Hampshire militia units in the American Revolution
Dragoons